2021 EU is a small near-Earth object that should pass within  of Earth in 2024. On 27 February 2024 it has a 1-in-32,000 chance of impacting Earth. It is estimated to be 28-meters in diameter which would make it larger than the Chelyabinsk meteor. On 27 February 2024 it is nominally expected to be  from Earth but has an uncertainty region of ±. The nominal 2024 Earth approach would have the asteroid only brightening to apparent magnitude 23 near closest approach.

The nominal orbit has it come to perihelion (closest approach to the Sun) on 8 January 2024 and then pass  from Earth on 22 February 2024.

References

External links 
 
 
 

Minor planet object articles (unnumbered)

Potential impact events caused by near-Earth objects
20210227
20210304